Emma Karin Peters (born 10 February 1978) is a Swedish actress. She studied at the Teaterhögskolan in Stockholm between 2000 and 2004. She has worked as an actress at Backa teater, Östgötateatern, Uppsala stadsteater and toured with the Dramaten and Riksteatern.

She has acted in TV shows like Vita lögner, Krama mig, Boy Machine, Grotesco and Gustafsson 3 tr.

References

External links 

Living people
1979 births
Swedish actresses